The 2016–17 season of the women's Regionalliga was the 13th season of Germany's third-tier women's football league using the current format.

North

Top scorers
.

Northeast

Top scorers
.

West

Top scorers
.

Southwest

Top scorers
.

South

Top scorers
.

References

2016-17
3